is a railway station in the city of Annaka, Gunma, Japan, operated by the East Japan Railway Company (JR East).

Lines

Station layout
The station has two opposed side platforms connected to the station building by a footbridge. The station has a Midori no Madoguchi staffed ticket office.

Platforms

History
Isobe Station opened on 15 October 1885. With the privatization of the Japanese National Railways (JNR) on 1 April 1987, the station came under the control of JR East.

Passenger statistics
In fiscal 2019, the station was used by an average of 1060 passengers daily (boarding passengers only).

Surrounding area

 Usui River
 Isobe Onsen
 Isobe Post Office
 Shin-Etsu Chemical Gunma Branch

See also
 List of railway stations in Japan

References

External links

 JR East station information 

Shin'etsu Main Line
Railway stations in Gunma Prefecture
Railway stations in Japan opened in 1885
Stations of East Japan Railway Company
Annaka, Gunma